The 14 cm/40 11th Year Type naval gun was the standard surface battery for Japanese submarine cruisers of World War II. Most carried single guns, but Junsen type submarines carried two. Japanese submarines I-7 and I-8 carried an unusual twin mounting capable of elevating to 40°. The appended designation 11th year type refers to the horizontal sliding breech block on these guns. Breech block design began in 1922, or the eleventh year of the Taishō period in the Japanese calendar. The gun fired a projectile  in diameter, and the barrel was 40 calibers long (barrel length is 14 cm x 40 = 560 centimeters or 220 inches).

World War II
This gun was the weapon used by I-17 to sink SS Emidio and to later shell the Ellwood Oil Field near Santa Barbara, California. It was also used by I-25 for the Bombardment of Fort Stevens in Oregon near the mouth of the Columbia River and by I-26 to shell the Estevan Point lighthouse in British Columbia.

Similar weapon
A longer-barreled 14 cm/50 3rd Year Type naval gun was used aboard surface ships and for coastal defense. The 40 caliber/11th Year Type guns were intended for use against destroyers, and fired base-fuzed projectiles with thinner shell walls allowing a larger bursting charge than the 50 caliber/3rd Year Type guns for potential use against armored ships. The lower velocity 40 caliber gun had a useful life expectancy of 800 to 1000 effective full charges (EFC) per barrel.

Notes

References

External links

World War II naval weapons
Naval guns of Japan
140 mm artillery